Roberto Polo Guete (born December 21, 1980) is a Colombian football striker. He currently is a free agent.

After coming out of almost nowhere and having a great season with Equidad has recently got him a call up for a friendly game against Venezuela on April 30 of 2008. He played the whole game and scored in only 10 minutes into his debut.

External links
 Roberto Polo at BDFA.com.ar 
 

1980 births
Living people
Sportspeople from Barranquilla
Colombian footballers
Colombia international footballers
Categoría Primera A players
Unión Magdalena footballers
Brujas FC players
Cortuluá footballers
Deportivo Azogues footballers
La Equidad footballers
Cúcuta Deportivo footballers
Águilas Doradas Rionegro players
Llaneros F.C. players
Colombian expatriate footballers
Expatriate footballers in Ecuador
Expatriate footballers in Costa Rica
Association football forwards
21st-century Colombian people